USS Stallion may refer to:

  a district harbor tugboat built in 1920 and stricken in 1945.
  a  serving from 1945–1969 and later in the Dominican Republic Navy as Enriquillo (RM-22).

United States Navy ship names